Thunder on the Left is a novel by Christopher Morley, originally published in 1925. In it, Morley looks at maturity, individual growth, and human nature. It was adapted as a play by Jean Ferguson Black in 1934.

Movie rights in perpetuity were sold to Picture Entertainment International, Lee Caplin, for $52,000 in the 1990s.

Editions
Garden City, New York : Doubleday, Page & Company, 1925 LCCN 25027460
Garden City, New York : Doubleday, Page & Company, 1926
Garden City, N.Y., Doubleday, Doran & Company, Inc., 1936 LCCN 36009351
New York, Philosophical Library [1959] LCCN 59016366
Los Angeles, CA : Sun & Moon Press, 1995 LCCN 94048249 ; 
Poughkeepsie, NY : Vivisphere, 2000 LCCN 00101946 ;

References

External links
 

1925 American novels
Doubleday, Page & Company books